Bilall Dreshaj (1910–1987), better known as Biko, was an ethnic Albanian military leader in Kosovo and Novi Pazar in Yugoslavia.

He was born in the village of Dreshaj, in the Gllogoc region in Kosovo, the part of the Ottoman Empire. During World War II he fought in the Battle for Novi Pazar against the communists and the Chetniks.

World War II 
Bilall Dreshaj and his men were legalized to the occupier by Aćif Hadžiahmetović, Albanian collaborationist mayor of Novi Pazar, on October 2. On October 5 Dreshaj enter the city with noise and gunfire and put themselves under command of local authorities. During ethnic and religious fighting, Dreshaj and his gang burnt and plundered woman monastery Sopoćani. Most of the nuns escaped, one that was captured was brutally murdered. Billal Dreshaj with his brother Deko lead attack on villages of Gračane, Doljane and Zabrđe on November 2, which their troops burnt down, killing 11 Serbs in the action. Dreshaj brothers participated enthusiastically in violence against Serb community in Novi Pazar. During Battle of Novi Pazar, Dreshaj's men defended left wing of the main column. He was one of the main organisers of protests against arrival of Milan Nedić's troops in Novi Pazar during November 1942. Later in the war, Dreshaj became an officer in Hilfspolizei.

References

Sources
 

1910 births
1987 deaths
Albanian collaborators with Fascist Italy
Albanian collaborators with Nazi Germany
Yugoslav collaborators with Fascist Italy
Yugoslav collaborators with Nazi Germany